The Men's National Champions are the National Champions for squash in the United States.  These winners are the officially recognized champions by U.S. Squash, the national governing body. From 1907 until 1989, the national championship was contested through hardball squash. When the national governing body began recognizing international softball as the official game in the United States, the national championship also switched to softball.  The first softball national championship, also known as the S.L. Green, was conducted in 1990 and was won by Mark Talbott. The S.L. Green, unlike the previous national championship, is limited to U.S. citizens only. The National Hardball Championship would continue past this date, but was no longer recognized as the official Men's National Championship.

Men's National Champions

Note: The official Men's National Championship (hardball) became the S.L. Green (softball) in 1990.

Records

Most Overall Titles

Most University Alumni Titles

Most High School Alumni Titles

See also
US Junior Open squash championship
U.S. Squash
Women's National Champions (Squash)

References

Squash in the United States
Squash tournaments in the United States